The Old Kazeruni dialect (UniPers: Kâzeruniye qadim) is an extinct Southwestern Iranian language spoken in the city of Kazerun in Southern Iran.

Sample sentences

See also
 Dialects of Fars
 Persian dialects and varieties
 Southwestern Iranian languages
 Iranian languages

References

Further reading
Adib Tusi, M.A., 1381 AP / 2002 AD. Lahjeye Kâzeruniye qadin, Kâzeruniye. (in Persian).
Osman, Mahmud ebn, 1358 AP / 1979 AD. فردوس المرشديه في اسرار الصمديه. به انضمام روايت ملخص آن موسوم به انوارالمرشد في اسرار الصمديه؛ به كوشش ايرج افشار. انجمن آثار ملي
A. A. Sadeqi, "KAZERUN iii. Old Kazerun Dialect", Encyclopaedia Iranica, Vol. XVI, Fasc. 2, pp. 216–217 

Fars Province
Languages of Iran
Southwestern Iranian languages
Extinct languages of Asia